Seroczyn  is a village in the administrative district of Siedlce County, Masovian Voivodeship, in east-central Poland.

The village has an approximate population of 770.

External links
 Jewish Community in Seroczyn on Virtual Shtetl
Seroczyn on the web

References

Seroczyn
Holocaust locations in Poland